is a Japanese video game store known for its collection of retrogames.

Description 
The main store is in Akihabara, Tokyo, a district known for its video game, anime, and manga retail business. There is a second Tokyo location in Higashiikebukuro. Outside of Tokyo, another location is found in Nipponbashi, Osaka. In total, there are 10 locations.

While the store carries game culture-related paraphernalia, the flagship three-floor store is dedicated to rare Japanese games from older consoles. The first floor hosts the store's Nintendo Famicom and Japanese home PC games (MSX 2, etc.), while the second houses games for more modern consoles: the Nintendo 64, PlayStation, Sega Saturn, and other consoles and handheld games from that era. Super Potato added its third floor, a small video arcade, in 2007. Games journalists were particularly fond of Super Potato's Famicom collection.

Kat Bailey of USgamer described Super Potato as "a museum as much as a shop" based on how visitors serendipitously interact with the games on display, as opposed to the deliberate choice of downloading a game at home. She predicted that the store would become more significant as retrogaming increases in popularity. Wired described the store as "legendary".

References

External links 

 
  

Retail companies of Japan
Video game companies of Japan